Teodor Bârcă (12 June 1894 – 12 May 1993) was a Bessarabian politician and professor, who on 27 March 1918 voted the union of Bessarabia with Romania. He was the vice president of Sfatul Țării, the parliament of Bessarabia at the time.

Biography 
Bârcă was born on 12 June 1894 in Costești, Ialoveni, then in the Bessarabia Governorate of the Russian Empire. He was a member of Sfatul Țării in 1917–1918. As vice-president of the parliament, he signed some acts, from and after March 27, together with Gheorghe Buruiană, another vice-president of the parliament.

Gallery

Bibliography

External links 
 Arhiva pentru Sfatul Țării
 Deputații Sfatului Țării și Lavrenti Beria

Notes

1894 births
1993 deaths
People from Ialoveni District
People from Kishinyovsky Uyezd
Moldovan MPs 1917–1918